The 1975 European Championship can refer to European Championships held in several sports:

 1975 European Rugby League Championship
 Eurobasket 1975